The lesser Congo shrew (Congosorex verheyeni) is a species of mammal in the family Soricidae found in Cameroon, the Central African Republic, the Republic of the Congo, and Gabon. Its natural habitat is subtropical or tropical moist lowland forest.

References

Congosorex
Taxonomy articles created by Polbot
Mammals described in 2002